Jean Namotte (1 December 1934 – 6 April 2019) was a Belgian politician for the Socialist Party (PS), who was a member of the Parliament of Wallonia, representing Liège from 1995 to 2004.

References

1934 births
2019 deaths
Members of the Parliament of Wallonia
Socialist Party (Belgium) politicians
21st-century Belgian politicians